Ahmed Alaa Eldin, widely known as Ahmed Alaa, (  born January 1, 1994) is an Egyptian footballer. He plays as a defender for Egyptian Premier League club Al Ahly.

References

1994 births
Living people
Egyptian footballers
Al Ahly SC players
Egyptian Premier League players
Footballers from Cairo
Association football central defenders